Ross County can refer to:

 Ross County, Ohio, a region in the United States
 Ross County F.C., a Scottish football club
 Ross-shire, a county in Scotland